The Soul of the City is an album by American jazz arranger and conductor Manny Albam featuring performances recorded in 1966 and originally issued on the Solid State label.

Reception
The Allmusic review by Ken Dryden stated "these progressive big band charts have held up very well over the decades since The Soul of the City was first issued by Solid State in 1966. This beautifully recorded album is well worth picking up".

Track listing
All compositions by Manny Albam
 "Born on Arrival" - 4:30
 "The Children's Corner" - 2:49
 "Museum Pieces" - 4:41
 "The Game of the Year" - 2:47
 "A View from the Outside" - 5:52
 "Tired Faces Going Places" - 3:59
 "A View from the Inside" - 5:28
 "Ground Floor Rear (Next to the Synagogue)" - 3:57
 "Riverview" - 2:55
 "El Barrio Latino" - 2:15

Personnel
Big Band arranged and conducted by Manny Albam including:
Freddie Hubbard, Joe Newman, Ernie Royal - trumpet 
Burt Collins - trumpet, flugelhorn
J. J. Johnson - trombone
Jerome Richardson - flute
Phil Woods - alto saxophone
Frank Wess - tenor saxophone
Hank Jones - piano
Mike Mainieri - vibraphone
Richard Davis - bass

References

Solid State Records (jazz label) albums
Manny Albam albums
1966 albums
Albums produced by Sonny Lester
Albums arranged by Manny Albam
Albums conducted by Manny Albam